Aleksei Sergeyevich Rogachyov (born 7 December 1979) is a former Russian professional footballer.

Club career
Rogachyov made his debut in the Russian Premier League in 2000 for FC Lokomotiv Nizhny Novgorod.

References

1979 births
Living people
Russian footballers
Association football goalkeepers
FC Baltika Kaliningrad players
FC Lokomotiv Nizhny Novgorod players
Russian Premier League players
Olimpia Elbląg players
Russian expatriate footballers
Expatriate footballers in Poland
Russian expatriate sportspeople in Poland